Eau Claire (French for "clear water", pl. eaux claires) is the name of a number of locations and features in North America.  The name is pronounced as if it were spelled "O'Clare".

Place names (Canada)

Communities
Eau Claire, Calgary, a neighborhood in Calgary, Alberta
Eau Claire, Ontario, a community approximately eight miles west of Mattawa, Ontario
Eaux Claires (Edmonton), a neighborhood in Edmonton, Alberta

Lakes
Lac à l'Eau Claire, a lake in northern Quebec

Geologic feature
Eau Claire Gorge, a section of rapids along the Amable du Fond River near Eau Claire, Ontario

Place names (United States of America)

Communities
Eau Claire, Wisconsin, the largest incorporated place by this name
University of Wisconsin-Eau Claire, often referred to as "Eau Claire" or "UW Eau Claire")
Eau Claire, Michigan
Eau Claire, Pennsylvania
Eau Claire, South Carolina, a suburban neighborhood of Columbia, South Carolina
Little Eau Claire, Wisconsin, an unincorporated community

County
Eau Claire County, Wisconsin

Rivers
Eau Claire River (disambiguation), three rivers in Wisconsin (articles named according to rivers to which each of the three rivers are tributaries): 
Eau Claire River (Chippewa River) 
Eau Claire River (St. Croix River)
Eau Claire River (Wisconsin River)

Lakes
Lake Eau Claire, a reservoir in eastern Eau Claire County, Wisconsin, formed by a dam on the Eau Claire River (Chippewa River tributary)

Religion
Episcopal Diocese of Eau Claire, Wisconsin